José Agustín de Lecubarri y Gorostiza, KB (25 June 1802 – 6 January 1874), was an Anglo-Spanish diplomat, naval officer and peer, who was noted for being the youngest person ever to be named Consul General and hold office for foreign affairs. His significant diplomatic achievements during the First Carlist War earned him the Grand Cross of the Order of Isabella the Catholic, as well as the Order of Charles III.

Early years

Lecubarri was born in London into an ancient Spanish lineage, son of the Franco-Spanish Hussar cavalry officer Manuel de Lecubarri y Uraga and Manuela Gorostiza y Egusqueaguirre. He returned to Spain briefly following his birth to be baptised through the Catholic Church 2 August 1802, at the Church of Saint Vincent near Bilbao. 

His military career began on 4 September 1824 as Midshipman, rising to Frigate Ensign in June 1825 aboard the frigate Aretusa, thereafter promoted to captain of said frigate in January 1828. Such actions as captain earned him the Cross to Naval Merit.

Diplomatic career

In 1833, he left the Navy to devote himself to diplomacy. Back in London he joins as Consul General of Spain to the United Kingdom, being the youngest in history to hold such office. Lecubarri and the ambassador, Juan Nepomuceno Vial, managed to consolidate an exceptional relationship with mutually supportive policies, which would serve as a breeding ground for the sending of troops by the British Government in the First Carlist War. The British Auxiliary Legion became a determining factor in the course of the war.

On 30 July 1835 the first battalion of the British Auxiliary Legion arrived in Santander, with the rest of the troops arriving throughout the summer. 1000 soldiers received shelter in the city, while another 4000 settled in the Monastery of Monte Corbán At the end of the summer of 1836, a number close to 10,000 men of the unit were concentrated in the outskirts of San Sebastián led by George De Lacy Evans who in turn was under the command of the General Luis Fernández de Córdova.

His services to the crown during the beginning of the First Carlist War earned him the cross of the Order of Charles III. Subsequently, and as a reward for his encouragement of favourable relations and cooperation between Spain and his country of birth, the queen Isabela II imposed him the Grand Cross of the Order of Isabella the Catholic in 1847.

Despite his loyal allegiance to Queen Isabella, José Agustín de Lecubarri confessed his inclination towards the old order several times, praising the war achievements of the Infante Carlos María Isidro on numerous occasions.

He died on 6 January 1874 in Bilbao, Spain.

Honours

National
  House of Bourbon: Knight Cross of the Order of Charles III (1834)
  House of Bourbon: White Cross of Naval Merit (1829)

Foreign
  House of Hanover: Knight Companion of the Most Honourable Order of the Bath (1836)

Heraldry

See also

Spain-United Kingdom relations
Carlist Wars

References

1802 births
1874 deaths
Diplomats from London
19th-century Spanish people
19th-century British diplomats
Alumni of Oriel College, Oxford
People educated at Eton College
Knights Grand Cross of the Order of Isabella the Catholic
Honorary Companions of the Order of the Bath